The Hawaiian butterflyfish (Chaetodon tinkeri), also known as Tinker's butterflyfish, is a marine ray-finned fish, a butterflyfish belonging to the family Chaetodontidae of order Perciformes. It is found in the central Pacific Ocean.

Description
It swims alone or in pairs and occasionally in small aggregations. Its coloring is divided on the diagonal between black and white. It has gold dorsal and tail fins, and a gold vertical bar across its eyes. The dorsal fin has 13-14 spines and 18-22 soft rays while the anal fin has 3 spines and 16-18 soft rays.

Range and habitat 
This fish inhabits Hawaii, Johnston Atoll and the Marshall Islands in the tropical Pacific Ocean.

Feeding 
The Hawaiian butterflyfish feeds on a variety of planktonic and benthic organisms.

Taxonomy and etymology
The Hawaiian butterflyfish was first formally described by the American ichthyologist Leonard Peter Schultz (1901-1986) in 1952 with the type locality given as Nanakuli on Oahu in Hawaii.

In the aquarium 
These fish are somewhat popular in aquaria.

References

Chaetodon
Fish of Hawaii
Fish described in 1951